Richard Karl Hjalmar Frey (1886–1965) was a Finnish entomologist.

From 1919 to 1955, Richard  Frey  was head of  the Finnish Museum of Natural History. He was primarily interested in 
Diptera and he described many new species in this Order. He studied exotic insects as well as those of Finland, especially those of Madeira and Cape Verde. Frey acquired by exchange or purchase many collections, notably the Georg Böttcher (1865–1915) collection of Philippine Diptera. When he retired, the University of Finland purchased his collection for the museum.

Works
Partial list
1941 Volume VI.Diptera. Enumeratio insectorum fenniae Helsingfors Entomologiska Bytesförening, Helsingfors
1949 Die Dipterenfauna der Insel Madeira  Sac. Scient. Fenn. Comm. Biol. 8, 16: l-47.
1958 with Walter Hackman Zur Kenntnis der Diptera Brachycera der Kapverdischen Inseln. Volume 18 Commentationes biologicae in Entomologische Ergebnisse der finnländischen Kanaren-Expedition 1947-51 Issue 20 Akademische Buchhandlung.

References
Hackman,W [Richard Hjalmar Frey] 1966 Arsb. Vuosil Soc Sci fenn. 44:1-7

Finnish entomologists
1965 deaths
1886 births
Dipterists
20th-century zoologists